D. Bailey Merrill (November 22, 1912 – October 14, 1993) was an American lawyer and politician who served one term as a U.S. Representative from Indiana from 1953 to 1955.

Biography
Born in Hymera, Indiana, Merrill graduated from Indiana State Teachers College, Terre Haute, Indiana in 1933. He graduated from Indiana University School of Law - Bloomington, Indiana in 1937. He was a high school teacher in Hymers, Indiana from 1933 to 1935 and a lawyer in private practice. 

He joined the United States Army in 1942 as a private in field artillery and rose to the rank of captain upon release in March 1946. He served with the Two Hundredth and the 91st Field Artillery Observation Battalion in the European Theater of Operations in World War II.

Congress
Merrill was elected as a Republican to the Eighty-third Congress (January 3, 1953 – January 3, 1955). He was an unsuccessful candidate for reelection in 1954 to the Eighty-fourth Congress and for election in 1956 to the Eighty-fifth Congress.

Death
He died on October 14, 1993, in Evansville, Indiana. He was interred in Alexander Memorial Park, Evansville, Indiana.

References

1912 births
1993 deaths
Indiana State University alumni
Indiana University Maurer School of Law alumni
People from Sullivan County, Indiana
20th-century American politicians
Burials in Indiana
Republican Party members of the United States House of Representatives from Indiana
United States Army personnel of World War II
United States Army officers